The Shaanxi Tianze Red Wolves are a Chinese professional women's basketball club based in Weinan, Shaanxi, playing in the Women's Chinese Basketball Association (WCBA). The team is owned by the Tianze Group.

Season-by-season records

Current players

Notable former players

  Morgan Tuck (2017–18)

See also
 Shaanxi Wolves, the men's professional basketball team in Shaanxi

References 

Women's Chinese Basketball Association teams
Sport in Shaanxi
Weinan
Basketball teams established in 2017